Anna Holliday "Holly" Benson (born June 4, 1971) was a member of the Florida House of Representatives.  In November 2000, Benson became the first Republican elected to the District 3 seat, succeeding Democrat DeeDee Ritchie.  On December 28, 2006, Florida's Governor-elect Charlie Crist appointed Benson to the position of Secretary of the Florida Department of Business and Professional Regulation.  On December 31, 2006, Benson resigned from the Florida House of Representatives, ending her legislative service to the State of Florida. In February, 2008, Florida Governor Charlie Crist appointed Benson to the position of Secretary of the Florida Agency for Health Care Administration.

Personal background 

Benson was born in Camp Lejeune, North Carolina and moved to Miami, Florida in 1976. She is a graduate of Pensacola's Booker T. Washington High School (1989), Dartmouth College (A.B., 1993) and the Fredric G. Levin College of Law at the University of Florida (J.D., 1996). Benson was employed as a municipal bond lawyer, prior to her appointment to the Department of Business and Professional Regulation in December 2006. In 2008, Benson took over as secretary of the Florida Agency for Health Care Administration.  She replaced Dr. Andrew Agwunobi, who is separating from the Administration after a little more than year on the job, to return to the private sector in Washington.

Legislative service 

Representative Benson previously served in the Florida House of Representatives as the Chair of the Health and Families Council, as well as Co-Chair of the Select Committee on Medicaid Reform.  Benson also chaired the Select Committee on Article V, which was tasked with implementing a 1998 constitutional amendment that required a major overhaul of the Florida state court system.

On December 31, 2006, Benson resigned from the Florida House of Representatives, ending her legislative service to the State of Florida.

Previous council and committee memberships 

 Health and Family Council (Chair)
 Select Committee on Medicaid Reform (Co-Chair)
 Fiscal Council
 Governmental Operations Committee
 Growth Management Committee
 Health Care Appropriations Committee
 Rules and Calendar Council

References

External links 
Profile of Benson at the Official Website of the Florida House of Representatives
List of Bills Sponsored by Benson
Contact Representative Benson
Interest Group Ratings of Benson at Project Vote Smart
Florida Department of Business and Professional Regulation

Living people
University of Florida alumni
1971 births
Republican Party members of the Florida House of Representatives
Women state legislators in Florida
People from Camp Lejeune, North Carolina
21st-century American women